Avoyan (Armenian: Ավոյան) is a popular Armenian surname. Notable people with the surname include:

Artashes Avoyan (born 1972), Armenian lawyer
Hovhannes Avoyan (born 1965), Armenian entrepreneur
Tatoul Avoyan (born 1964), Armenian rabiz singer

Armenian-language surnames